Helmut Kristofics-Binder (born 1960) is an Austrian former competitive figure skater. He is a three-time (1979–81) Austrian national champion and competed at seven ISU Championships. His best results were fifth at the 1977 Junior Worlds in Megève, where he was first in figures, and 12th at the 1980 Europeans in Gothenburg.

He is the brother, older by one year, of Austrian figure skater Claudia Kristofics-Binder.  Upon retirement, he become an airline pilot, currently working for Ryanair.

Competitive highlights

References 

1960 births
Austrian male single skaters
Living people